Zell am Ziller is a municipality in the Schwaz district in the Austrian state of Tyrol. The name derives from the river Ziller.

Climate

Population

Facilities 
The Zillertal Arena was formed in 2000 from a merger of the ski areas of Zell, Gerlos and Königsleiten and is the largest ski area in the Ziller valley. It is accessed by the Rosenalmbahn and, since the 2010/11 season, by the Karspitzbahn, whose valley station is located in the parish of Zell. Several ski bus companies operate in Zell am Ziller during the skiing season. When there is sufficient snow, cross-country skiing trails are cut at Ziller (both classic and, in some cases, skating).

References

Cities and towns in Schwaz District